Peter Kimlin is an Australian rugby union football player who plays for Grenoble in the French Top 14.

He played for the ACT Brumbies in the Super Rugby competition from 2007 through to 2013. That final year in 2013 he captained the victorious Brumbies side against The British and Irish Lions who were the first Australian club side to be successful in over 40 years. Later that year he was a part of the side which fell to NZ Chiefs in the Super Rugby Final.

He plays as a lock, flanker and also number 8.

On 13 October 2010 it was announced that Kimlin signed a short-term contract to join the Exeter Chiefs in England during the 2010/11 season in order to get game-time prior to the upcoming Super Rugby season and his bid for a spot in Australia's Rugby World Cup squad, having 18 months of action with nerve damage to his shoulder. However his stay in the UK with the Chiefs was cut short after suffering a knee injury in training with Exeter following a collision with team-mate Paul McKenzie.

It was announced on 20 April 2013 that Kimlin, along with Brumbies teammate Dan Palmer, had joined French Top 14 side FC Grenoble.

References

External links
Brumbies Profile
itsrugby.co.uk Profile

Australian rugby union players
1985 births
Living people
Australia international rugby union players
Exeter Chiefs players
ACT Brumbies players
FC Grenoble players
People educated at Canberra Grammar School
Rugby union flankers
Expatriate rugby union players in France
Rugby union players from Canberra